Klaus Rogge (born 3 March 1979 in Buchen) is a German rower.

References 

 

1979 births
Living people
German male rowers
People from Buchen
Sportspeople from Karlsruhe (region)
World Rowing Championships medalists for Germany
21st-century German people